The Women's 4 × 200 metre freestyle relay competition of the 2020 European Aquatics Championships was held on 21 May 2021.

Records
Before the competition, the existing world, European and championship records were as follows.

Results

Heats
The heats were held at 11:04.

Final
The final was held on 21 May 2021 at 19:49.

References

Women's 4 x 200 metre freestyle relay